The Bergen-Byron Swamp is a protected  swamp and nature preserve located in the towns of Byron and Bergen, New York. It is over 10,000 years old. The Bergen Swamp Preservation Society was formed in 1935 to protect and preserve this delicate ecological environment.

It was designated a National Natural Landmark  in 1964, the first such site to be designated.

Flora and fauna

A list of all some of the most common organisms in the swamp are as follows:

 Beech tree
 Black rat snake
 Black huckleberry
 Cardinal flower
 Cinnamon fern
 Coal skink lizard
 Death angel
 Dog-tooth violets
 Eastern massasauga rattlesnake

 Emerald swallowtail
 Gay wings
 Green snake
 Hine's emerald dragonfly
 Honeysuckle
 Jack-in-the-pulpit
 Marsh marigold
 Milkweeds
 Purple pitcher plant

 Queen snake
 Red salamander
 Ribbon snake
 Spotted turtle
 White ash tree
 White-tailed deer
 Wolf spider
 Woodcock

Visiting
Individuals may visit, but groups need to ask permission first.

See also

List of National Natural Landmarks in New York

References

External links
Official Site
Scientific study of swamp

National Natural Landmarks in New York (state)
Protected areas of Genesee County, New York
Landforms of Genesee County, New York
Nature reserves in New York (state)
Wetlands of New York (state)
Swamps of the United States
1935 establishments in New York (state)
Protected areas established in 1935